DSI may refer to:

Abbreviations 
 DontStayIn, a social networking website

Airport 
 IATA airport code for Destin Executive Airport

Businesses 
DSI is an initialism for the following companies:
 Daiichi Sankyo, Incorporated
 Data Sciences International, a company in Saint Paul, United States
 Dave Smith Instruments, an American synthesizer company
 Deep Space Industries, American-based asteroid mining startup
 Deep Springs International
 Delphi Schools, Inc.
 Delphine Software International, a now bankrupt software company
 Destination Software, Inc., a video game company
 Distinctive Software Inc.,   a video game company
 Diversified Specialty Institute Holdings, Inc., a US-based healthcare group
 Drivetrain Systems International, an Australian automotive transmissions manufacturer
 DYWIDAG Systems International, an international supplier of ground anchors and post-tensioning systems
 State Hydraulic Works (Turkey) (Turkish: Devlet Su İşleri (DSİ)), a state agency in Turkey

Education 
 Decision Sciences Institute, a professional association focusing on the application of quantitative research and qualitative research to the decision problems of individuals, organizations, and society.
 Deutsche Schule Istanbul, a private high school in Istanbul

Gaming 
 Dead Space Ignition, a video game in the Dead Space series
 Nintendo DSi, Nintendo's third iteration of the Nintendo DS handheld game console

Music 
 Dope Stars Inc., an industrial metal band formed in 2002

Organizations and institutions 
 Special Intervention Detachment an Algerian Special Forces Unit of the National gendarmerie for counter-terrorism actions
 Data Storage Institute, a Singaporean national research institute
 Department of Special Investigation, a Thai government organization for special investigation
 Dienst Speciale Interventies, a Dutch government organization for counter-terrorism actions
 DSI Samson Group, a Sri Lankan conglomerate
 Deutsches SOFIA Institut, an institute helping develop SOFIA

Science, mathematics and medicine 
 Depolarization-induced suppression of inhibition, a type of modulation of inhibitory neurotransmission
 Diffused Surface Illumination, a multi-touch technique using a special acrylic Endlighten that disperses even light supplied by edge lighting the acrylic.
 Digital sequence information, information from sequenced DNA and other large molecules such as RNA or proteins, which can be processed digitally.
 The Stuttgart Database of Scientific Illustrators 1450–1950

Technology 
 Data storage interrupt, the name used for a segmentation fault on PowerPC-based processors
 Data Stream Interface, computer network protocol to run Apple Filing Protocol over TCP
 Delay slot instruction, a term from computer architecture
 Digital Serial Interface, a protocol for controlling of lighting in buildings
 Display Serial Interface, a serial protocol for mobile display devices
 Diverterless supersonic inlet, a type of jet engine air intake